Jan N. Václav Pech (8 April 1886 – 20 June 1924) was a Czech footballer who played as a goalkeeper.

Club career
During his playing career, Pech played for Meteor Prague.

International career
On 1 April 1906, Pech made his debut for Bohemia in Bohemia's second game, starting in a 1–1 draw against Hungary. It was Pech's only cap for Bohemia.

Notes

References

1886 births
1924 deaths
Footballers from Prague
Association football goalkeepers
Czech footballers
Czechoslovak footballers
Bohemia international footballers